Warm Heart of Africa is the debut studio album for the Very Best. The album was released digitally on August 25, 2009 and physically on October 6, 2009. Rhapsody deemed it the 18th best album of 2009.

Track listing 
 "Yalira"  – 3:44 (mp3)
 "Chalo"  – 3:14
 "Warm Heart of Africa" (featuring Ezra Koenig)  – 3:49
 "Mwazi"  – 1:08
 "Nsokoto"  – 5:30
 "Angonde"  – 4:54
 "Julia"  – 4:08
 "Mfumu"  – 3:52
 "Ntende Uli"  - 3:21
 "Rain Dance" (featuring M.I.A.) – 4:28 (mp3)
 "Kamphopo" - 3:13
 "Kada Manja  - 4:35
 "Zam'dziko - 2:27

References

2009 debut albums
The Very Best albums